Port Huron is the name of a city and a township in St. Clair County, Michigan. See:

 Port Huron, Michigan
 Port Huron Township, Michigan

See also:

 Port Huron Statement

de:Port Huron